The Social Responsiveness Scale, developed by John Constantino and his colleagues in 2003, is a quantitative measure of autistic traits in 4–18 year olds. Its correlation with behaviour problems and autism spectrum disorder symptoms has been studied.  It can be assessed with an 18 question survey filled out by the child's parents or teacher.

The list of questions is subject to copyright.

See also
 Child Behavior Checklist

References

Autism screening and assessment tools